is a Japanese voice actress from Aichi, Kanie, Japan employed by Genki Project.

Voice roles
Ef: A Tale of Memories. as Kei Shindō
Getbackers as nurse (ep 35)
Haru no Ashioto as Nagomi Fujikura
Kodocha as Rumiko Yokota (ep 88)
Sentimental Graffiti series as Adachi Taeko
Wind: A Breath of Heart as Nozomi Fujimiya
Zegapain as Fosetta/Fosetta II

Dubbing
The Amazing World of Gumball

References

External links
Junko Okada at Genki Project's website 

1973 births
Living people
Japanese voice actresses
Voice actresses from Aichi Prefecture